Harvey Hook (August 8, 1935 – October 14, 2011) was a bobsledder who represented the United States Virgin Islands. He competed in the two man event at the 1988 Winter Olympics.

References

External links
 

1935 births
2011 deaths
United States Virgin Islands male bobsledders
Olympic bobsledders of the United States Virgin Islands
Bobsledders at the 1988 Winter Olympics
Place of birth missing